Galiakberovo (Ğäliäkbär) is a rural locality (a village) and the administrative centre of Galiakberovsky Selsoviet, Burzyansky District, Bashkortostan, Russia. The population was 483 as of 2010. There are 7 streets.

Geography 
Galiakberovo is located 41 km northwest of Starosubkhangulovo (the district's administrative centre) by road. Verkhny Nugush is the nearest rural locality.

References 

Rural localities in Burzyansky District